The 1987 World Table Tennis Championships women's singles was the 39th edition of the women's singles championship.
He Zhili defeated Yang Young-ja in the final by three sets to nil, to win the title.

Results

See also
 List of World Table Tennis Championships medalists

References

-
1987 in women's table tennis